Toto Looks for a House is a 1949 Italian comedy film directed by Mario Monicelli and Steno. The film is stylistically related to Italian neorealism, though it can be seen as a parody. It was a commercial success, being the second most popular film at the box office that year.

Plot
In an afterwar Italy the problem for every citizen is to find a comfortable place to live. Beniamino Lomacchio (Totò) is one of the many people without a home and, together with his family, he's been living in a school. He cannot live there much longer, though, because school re-opens in September. Beniamino is a poor clerk and does not know what to do; he just hopes he'll find a comfortable apartment with a landlord who doesn't ask for too much rent.

One day, however, Beniamino finds a place to move into: a cemetery caretaker's house. Not all the family is convinced it's a great idea. They stay there for a short while, fleeing when they think they see a ghost. After leaving the house, Beniamino finds another job at the studio of an artist. But even here the family Lomacchio will not agree with Beniamino. They then find a large apartment. But they've been cheated; the apartment has already been rented out to another family. Eventually, even after staying in the Colosseum, Beniamino is in a car accident. He's finally found a home: a psychiatric hospital.

Cast
 Totò as Beniamino Lomacchio
 Alda Mangini as Amalia, la moglie de Lomacchio
 Lia Molfesi as Aida, la figlia
 Mario Gattari as Figlio
 Aroldo Tieri as Checchino, il fidanzato
 Folco Lulli as Turco
 Enzo Biliotti as Il sindaco
 Mario Castellani as Truffatore
 Pietro De Vico as Cinese
 Flavio Forin as Vedovo
 Giacomo Furia as Pasquale Saluto
 Marisa Merlini as Patronessa
 Luigi Pavese as Capo ufficio
 Cesare Polacco as Vice custode
 Alfredo Ragusa as Bidello

References

Bibliography
 Bondanella, Peter. A History of Italian Cinema. Bloomsbury Publishing, 2009.

External links

1949 films
1949 comedy films
Italian comedy films
1940s Italian-language films
Italian black-and-white films
Films set in Rome
Films directed by Mario Monicelli
Films directed by Stefano Vanzina
Films scored by Carlo Rustichelli
Films with screenplays by Age & Scarpelli
1940s Italian films